Ahmed-Hasan Khokhar (born in British India) is a former tennis player from Pakistan.

Wimbledon
He is the first Pakistani (alongside Mahmoud Alam) to play at Wimbledon. He took part in the 1948 Wimbledon Championship during the pre-open era.

Scores
 1st round: lost to Philippe Washer of Belgium, 0–6, 0–6, 2–6.

References

Pakistani male tennis players
Living people
Year of birth missing (living people)